The 69th Street Transportation Center is a SEPTA terminal in the Terminal Square section of Upper Darby Township, Pennsylvania. It serves the Market–Frankford Line, Norristown High Speed Line, and SEPTA Routes 101 and 102 trolleys, and multiple bus routes. It is located at the end of 69th Street, a major retail corridor in Upper Darby Township across Market Street (Route 3) from the Tower Theater. Until 2011, the station was primarily known as 69th Street Terminal.

69th Street is the second-busiest SEPTA transfer point, after its 15th Street/City Hall station, serving 35,000 passengers daily during the week. It is also the only SEPTA facility to serve both City Transit and Suburban Transit routes.

History

20th century

69th Street is one of the original Market Street Elevated stations built by the Philadelphia Rapid Transit Company; the line opened for service on March 4, 1907, between here and  stations. Shortly after on May 22 of the same year, the Philadelphia and Western Railroad opened the first segment of what is now the Norristown High-Speed Line, running from 69th Street to a farm on Sugarton Road in Strafford. By 1931, the P&W was operating Bullet electric multiple units between 69th Street and Norristown Transportation Center.

The Great Hall station house, which opened in 1907 with the Market Street Elevated, was a catalyst for nearby development in Upper Darby, considered to be one of the earliest examples of transit-oriented development.

The Media–Sharon Hill Line (routes 101 and 102) opened slightly earlier, having begun service to Sharon Hill in March 1906 and to Media in March 1913. The lines were operated by the Philadelphia and West Chester Traction Company.

In 1954, the Media, Sharon Hill, and Norristown lines were purchased by the Philadelphia Suburban Transportation Company (PSTC), also known as Red Arrow Lines. PSTC merged into SEPTA in 1970, unifying all services in the station under a single operator for the first time on January 29.

21st century

On February 2, 2016, SEPTA opened a brand new West Terminal at the station, serving multiple bus routes and the 101 and 102 trolley lines. The $19.6 million project brought new tracks and pavement, new platforms and ramps to the terminal building, as well as a green roof and eco-friendly LED lighting.

A train crash occurred here on August 23, 1986, injuring 44 and killing 1. Early on August 22, 2017, an inbound Norristown Line train crashed into an unoccupied train at the terminal, with a preliminary report of 33 injuries from the impact.

Plans for a new parking garage, which would bring 318 additional parking spaces to the station, were announced in October 2018. The garage would be located above the South Terminal bus berths, is expected to cost $37 million, and will break ground in summer 2020. A 2019 report suggested removing the bridge across Market Street in favor of a traffic-calmed intersection with crosswalks. Both measures would prepare the terminal for an increase in traffic following the proposed Norristown Line King of Prussia Spur.

Market–Frankford Line platforms
69th Street is the Market–Frankford Line's western terminus. East of here, the route travels thorough West and Center City Philadelphia along Market Street, and then continues northeast to Frankford Transportation Center. The station is one of two ground-level stations of the Market––Frankford Line, and one of two SEPTA rapid transit stations outside the Philadelphia city limits.

The station's three tracks and two platforms are located at the center of the terminal, sandwiched between the station building and the Norristown High Speed Line terminal. The northbound platform handles all alighting passengers while the southbound platform handles departing passengers. West of the station, a two-track balloon loop allows terminating trains to turn around and depart the station. There is also a large storage yard and a maintenance facility shared with the Media–Sharon Hill Line. Two MFL trains collided after one derails on the balloon track seriously injuring the operator.

Norristown High Speed Line platforms

SEPTA's Norristown High Speed Line (formerly Route 100) originates at 69th Street, continuing west and north to serve the communities of Haverford and Radnor before terminating at Norristown Transportation Center in Norristown. Unlike the Market–Frankford terminal, the Norristown Line tracks terminate at bumper blocks adjacent to the station, meaning that all platforms and tracks can handle both the boarding and alighting of passengers.

Bus and trolley routes

Surface transit lines at 69th Street are split into three distinct areas of the terminal. The largest of these areas is known as the West Terminal. It is located on a slightly elevated embankment west of the station house and adjacent to the intersection of Market Street and Victory Avenue. This area contains bus berths for routes , as well as two berths for the 101 and 102 trolleys. All bus routes at this terminal are operated by SEPTA's Suburban Division and operate west out of the station on West Chester Pike, State Road, or Garrett Road.

The station's South Terminal is adjacent to Market Street just east of 69th Street, also south of the terminal building. This area is located adjacent to the station's taxi stand and has berths for routes . Routes 21 and 68 are part of SEPTA's City Transit Division, while the remaining three are Suburban Division and former Red Arrow routes. These routes operate east into West Philadelphia on Market Street or south on 69th Street towards East Lansdowne.

Finally, the station's North Terminal handles the remaining six routes: . It is located north of the station building and heavy rail platforms, adjacent to the Market–Frankford/Media–Sharon Hill maintenance facility building and SEPTA Victory District garage. These buses depart the station via a private access road to Cardington Road and proceed north through Cobbs Creek Park before turning east towards West Philadelphia or west towards Lower Merion Township.

Station layout
The station building also houses SEPTA sales offices, stores, and eateries. There is also a 182-space park and ride lot east of the station building on Market Street. Norristown and Market–Frankford platforms are accessed via a mezzanine over the tracks that leads from the station house, while the Route 101/102 trolleys board on a loop at the western bus terminal. There are two tracks on the north side of the loop, but trolleys only use the outer track; the inner track, which is also paved with asphalt, is used for bus berths.

References

External links

 Views from Google Maps Street View:
 Main entrance
 West Terminal
 South Terminal
 North Terminal access road
 Images from NYCSubway.org:
Market-Frankford-El
MFL 69th Street Yard
Norristown High-Speed Line
Media-Sharon Hill Line

1907 establishments in Pennsylvania
Railway stations in Delaware County, Pennsylvania
Railway stations in the United States opened in 1907
SEPTA Market-Frankford Line stations
SEPTA Media–Sharon Hill Line stations
SEPTA Norristown High Speed Line stations
SEPTA stations and terminals